The 1962-63 Libyan Eastern Championship was a Libyan football championship that took place to decide who would represent the East at national level for the 1963-64 Libyan Premier League. The league was made up of eight teams, who played each other twice (14 games in total):

From Benghazi:
Ahly
Hilal
Najma
Nasr
Tahaddi

From Derna:

Ittihad Darnah
Darnes

From Tobruk:

Tobruk

League table

Results

1962–63 in African association football leagues
Premier League